Crematogaster aegyptiaca is an uncommon species of ant found mostly in Egypt.

References

External links

Insects described in 1862
aegyptiaca
Taxa named by Gustav Mayr